Nancy is an unincorporated community in Dickenson County, Virginia, in the United States.

History
A post office was established at Nancy in 1908, and remained in operation until it was discontinued in 1954. The community's name honors Nancy Counts Anderson.

References

Unincorporated communities in Dickenson County, Virginia
Unincorporated communities in Virginia